is a Japanese singer, songwriter, and arranger. Since her debut in 1985, she has recorded various singles and albums. In 1990, her album  peaked at position five on the Japanese charts. She sings the theme tune "Message #9" and closing titles song "Love Song" on the anime series Gasaraki

References

External links
Official website (Japanese)

1961 births
Living people
Japanese women singers
Japanese songwriters
Musicians from Kyoto Prefecture